Sterrhopterix is a genus of moths belonging to the family Psychidae.

The species of this genus are found in Europe and Russia.

Species:
 Sterrhopterix fusca (Haworth, 1809) 
 Sterrhopterix standfussi (Wocke, 1851)

References

Psychidae
Psychidae genera